Alessandro School is a K-12 public alternative school located in Moreno Valley, California, and is part of the Moreno Valley Unified School District. The school's mascot is a hawk.

External links
 

Alternative schools in California
Schools in Riverside County, California